I is an album by German band Die Krupps, released in 1992. Several songs on the album make use of film samples. On "Doppelgänger" and "The Power", samples of Star Wars can be heard. "One", which is a Metallica cover, contains samples from Born on the Fourth of July (1989), "Disclipes of Disclipine" contains samples from Omen III: The Final Conflict (1981).

Track listing

Personnel
 Jürgen Engler – vocals, keyboard, guitar, samples
 Ralf Dörper – samples
 Rüdiger Esch – bass guitar
 Volker Borchert – (live) drums
 René Schütz – guitar on "Metal Machine Music", "Doppelgänger" and "The Dawning of Doom"
 Frank Thoms – guitar on "Metal Machine Music", "Simply Say No" and "The Power and Rings of Steel"
 Dirk Ivens – second voice on "The Dawning of Doom"

References

1992 albums
Die Krupps albums
Rough Trade Records albums